In enzymology, a proline—tRNA ligase is an enzyme that catalyzes the chemical reaction

ATP + L-proline + tRNAPro  AMP + diphosphate + L-prolyl-tRNAPro

The 3 substrates of this enzyme are ATP, L-proline, and tRNA(Pro), whereas its 3 products are AMP, diphosphate, and L-prolyl-tRNA(Pro).

This enzyme participates in arginine and proline metabolism and aminoacyl-trna biosynthesis.

Nomenclature 

This enzyme belongs to the family of ligases, to be specific those forming carbon-oxygen bonds in aminoacyl-tRNA and related compounds.  The systematic name of this enzyme class is L-proline:tRNAPro ligase (AMP-forming). Other names in common use include prolyl-tRNA synthetase, prolyl-transferRNA synthetase, prolyl-transfer ribonucleate synthetase, proline translase, prolyl-transfer ribonucleic acid synthetase, prolyl-s-RNA synthetase, and prolinyl-tRNA ligase.

References

Further reading 

 
 

EC 6.1.1
Enzymes of known structure